Han Zihao is a Chinese Muay Thai fighter. He is currently fighting for ONE Championship. Han previously challenged Nong-O Gaiyanghadao for the ONE Bantamweight Muay Thai World Championship.

Biography and career

Han started martial arts in China with Sanda and the Muay Thai. At 14 years old he moved to Thailand to get better training.

ONE Championship
On July 27, 2018, Han made his ONE Championship debut against Panicos Yusuf at ONE Championship: Reign of Kings, losing by unanimous decision.

He picked up his first promotional win with a unanimous decision over Stergos Mikkios at ONE Championship: Beyond The Horizon on September 8, 2018.

On October 26, 2018, Han defeated Ryan Jakiri by first-round knockout at ONE Championship: Pursuit of Greatness.

He extended his ONE winning streak to three with a first-round technical knockout victory over Azwan Che Wil at ONE Championship: Conquest of Champions on November 23, 2018.

On February 16, 2019, Han Zihao faced Nong-O Gaiyanghadao for the inaugural ONE Bantamweight Muay Thai World Championship. He lost the fight by unanimous decision after five rounds.

He bounced back with a second-round knockout over Andrew Miller at ONE Championship: Legendary Quest on June 15, 2019.

On November 8, 2019, he lost to Kongsak Saenchaimuaythaigym by unanimous decision at ONE Championship: Masters of Fate.

On January 10, 2020, he lost to Mehdi Zatout by split decision at ONE Championship: A New Tomorrow.

Han returned to winning with a third-round knockout over Mohammed Bin Mahmoud at ONE Championship: Reign of Dynasties 2 on October 17, 2020.

Han was then scheduled to face Adam Noi at ONE Championship: Unbreakable 3 on January 22, 2021. However, the bout was postponed to take place at ONE Championship: Fists of Fury 2 on February 26, 2021. He won the fight via unanimous decision.

Han faced Ferrari Fairtex at ONE 161 on September 29, 2022. At the weigh-ins, Han Zihao weighed in at 153.75 lb, 8.75 lb over the bantamweight non-title fight limit of 145 pounds. the bout agreed to moved to the featherweight division (145–155 lbs) where Han was fined 30%, which went to Ferrari Fairtex. He lost the bout via unanimous decision.

Titles and accomplishments

 2013 China Muay Thai Champion
 
 Thailand TV3 Champion

Kickboxing record

|-  style="background:#FFBBBB;"
| 2022-09-29 || Loss ||align=left| Ferrari Fairtex || ONE 161 || Kallang, Singapore || Decision (Unanimous) || 3 || 3:00
|-
|-  style="background:#cfc;"
| 2021-11-12|| Win ||align=left| Victor Pinto || ONE Championship: NextGen II || Singapore || Decision (Unanimous) || 3 || 3:00
|-  style="background:#cfc;"
| 2021-02-26|| Win ||align=left| Adam Noi || ONE Championship: Fists Of Fury 2|| Kallang, Singapore || Decision (Unanimous) || 3 || 3:00
|-  style="background:#cfc;"
| 2020-10-17|| Win ||align=left| Mohammed Bin Mahmoud || ONE Championship: Reign of Dynasties 2|| Kallang, Singapore || KO (Punch) || 3 || 0:49
|-  style="background:#FFBBBB;"
| 2020-01-10|| Loss ||align=left| Mehdi Zatout || ONE Championship: A New Tomorrow || Bangkok, Thailand || Decision (Split) || 3 || 3:00
|-  style="background:#FFBBBB;"
| 2019-11-08|| Loss ||align=left| Kongsak Saenchaimuaythaigym ||ONE Championship: Masters of Fate||Manila, Philippines||Decision (Unanimous) || 3 || 3:00
|-  style="background:#cfc;"
| 2019-06-15|| Win ||align=left| Andrew Miller || ONE Championship: Legendary Quest|| Shanghai, China || KO (Punches) || 2 || 2:36
|-  style="background:#FFBBBB;"
| 2019-02-16|| Loss ||align=left| Nong-O Gaiyanghadaogym || ONE Championship: Clash of Legends ||Thailand || Decision (Unanimous)|| 5 || 3:00
|-
! style=background:white colspan=9 |
|-  style="background:#cfc;"
| 2018-11-23|| Win||align=left| Azwan Che Wil|| ONE Championship: Conquest of Champions ||Pasay, Philippines || TKO (Injury)|| 1 || 2:52
|-  style="background:#cfc;"
| 2018-10-26|| Win||align=left| Ryan Jakiri|| ONE Championship: Pursuit of Greatness ||Yangon, Myanmar || KO (Punch)	|| 1 || 1:39
|-  style="background:#cfc;"
| 2018-09-08|| Win||align=left| Stergos Mikkios || ONE Championship: Beyond The Horizon ||Shanghai, China || Decision (Unanimous)|| 3 || 3:00
|-  style="background:#FFBBBB;"
| 2018-07-27|| Loss||align=left| Panicos Yusuf || ONE Championship: Reign of Kings ||Manila, Philippines || Decision (Unanimous)|| 3 || 3:00
|-  style="background:#FFBBBB;"
| 2018-06-16 || Loss ||align=left| Rafi Bohic || Topking World Series || Surat Thani, Thailand || Decision  || 5 || 3:00
|-  style="background:#FFBBBB;"
| 2018-03-17 || Loss ||align=left| Yodpanomrung Jitmuangnon || Top King World Series  || Thailand || Decision || 3 || 3:00
|-  style="background:#cfc;"
| 2018-02-10 || Win||align=left| Petchboonchuay FA Group || Top King World Series  || China || KO || 3 ||
|-  style="background:#cfc;"
| 2017-11-18 || Win||align=left| Emerick Soekardjan ||EM Legend 25 || China || KO (Left high kick) || 1 ||
|-  style="background:#cfc;"
| 2017-10-25|| Win||align=left| Shunsuke Miyabi || Emei Legend 24 || China || KO || 3 ||1:38
|-  style="background:#FFBBBB;"
| 2017-09-30|| Loss||align=left| Sangmanee Sor Tienpo || Top King World Series - TK16 || Fuzhou, China || Decision || 3 ||3:00
|-  style="background:#FFBBBB;"
| 2017-08-05 || Loss ||align=left| Muangthai PKSaenchaimuaythaigym ||Topking World Series || Thailand || Decision || 3 || 3:00
|-  bgcolor="#cfc"
| 2017-06-10 || Win||align=left| Shogo Kuriaki || Kunlun Fight 62 || Bangkok, Thailand || KO || 2 ||
|-  style="background:#cfc;"
| 2017-02-07 || Win||align=left| Najib Djellodi || Emei Legend || China || Decision || 3||  3:00
|-  bgcolor="#c5d2ea"
| 2017-01-14 || Draw ||align=left| Sangmanee Sor Tienpo || Top King World Series - TK12 Hohhot || Hohhot, China || Draw || 3 || 3:00
|-  style="background:#cfc;"
| 2016-12-27 || Win||align=left| Jakkrit || Emei Legend || China || TKO || 2||  3:00
|-  style="background:#cfc;"
| 2016-10-15 || Win||align=left| Firdvas Boynazarov || THAI FIGHT Chengdu || China || TKO || 2 ||
|-  style="background:#cfc;"
| 2016-09-13 || Win ||align=left| Hiroki Tanaka || EM Legend || Thailand || TKO ||  ||
|-  style="background:#FFBBBB;"
| 2016-07-23 || Loss ||align=left| Victor Pinto || THAI FIGHT Proud to Be Thai || Thailand || Decision (unanimous) || 5 || 3:00
|-  style="background:#FFBBBB;"
| 2016-07-10 || Loss ||align=left| Rungravee Sasiprapa || Top King World Series || China || Decision (unanimous) || 3 || 3:00
|-  style="background:#FFBBBB;"
| 2016-05-31|| Loss ||align=left| Alexandr || EM Legend ||China || Decision || 3 || 3:00
|-  style="background:#FFBBBB;"
| 2016-03-20 || Loss ||align=left| Kwangrun || Super Muay Thai || Thailand || Decision || 3 || 3:00
|-  style="background:#FFBBBB;"
| 2016-03-12 || Loss ||align=left| Payak Samui Lukjaoporongtom Kromsappasamit || THAI FIGHT || Bangkok, Thailand || Decision (unanimous) || 3 || 3:00
|-  style="background:#FFBBBB;"
| 2015-12-22 || Loss ||align=left| Gregoire Gottardi  || Emei Legend || China || Decision  || 3 || 3:00
|-  style="background:#cfc;"
| 2015-12-12 || Win ||align=left| Bang Pei  || Taishan Decision || Yantai, China ||  ||  ||
|-  style="background:#cfc;"
| 2015-10-11 || Win ||align=left| Sangpanom Por.Petchaikaew || Max Muay Thai || Bangkok, Thailand ||  ||  ||
|-  style="background:#cfc;"
| 2015-09 || Win ||align=left|  ||  || Thailand ||  ||  ||
|-  style="background:#cfc;"
| 2015-08-30 || Win ||align=left| Dechsanit Sor Sor Nawath || Max Muay Thai || Bangkok, Thailand ||  ||  ||
|-
| colspan=9 | Legend:

References 

Chinese male kickboxers
1995 births
Living people
Chinese Muay Thai practitioners
ONE Championship kickboxers
Sportspeople from Henan
People from Zhengzhou